PSPP  is a free software application for analysis of sampled data, intended as a free alternative for IBM SPSS Statistics. It has a graphical user interface and conventional command-line interface. It is written in C and uses GNU Scientific Library for its mathematical routines. The name has "no official acronymic expansion".

Features
This software provides a comprehensive set of capabilities including frequencies, cross-tabs comparison of means (t-tests and one-way ANOVA), linear regression, logistic regression, reliability (Cronbach's alpha, not failure or Weibull), and re-ordering data, non-parametric tests, factor analysis, cluster analysis, principal components analysis, chi-square analysis and more.

At the user's choice, statistical output and graphics are available in ASCII, PDF, PostScript, SVG or HTML formats. A range of statistical graphs can be produced, such as histograms, pie-charts, scree plots, and np-charts.

PSPP can import Gnumeric and OpenDocument spreadsheets, Postgres databases, comma-separated values and ASCII files. It can export files in the SPSS 'portable' and 'system' file formats and to ASCII files.  Some of the libraries used by PSPP can be accessed programmatically; PSPP-Perl provides an interface to the libraries used by PSPP.

Origins
The PSPP project (originally called "Fiasco") was born at the end of the 1990s as a free software replacement for SPSS, which is a data management and analysis tool, at the time produced by SPSS Inc. The nature of SPSS's proprietary licensing and the presence of digital restrictions management motivated the author to write an alternative which later became functionally identical, but with permission for everyone to copy, modify and share.

Third Party Reviews
In the book "SPSS For Dummies", the author discusses PSPP under the heading of "Ten Useful Things You Can Find on the Internet". Another review of free to use statistical software also finds that the statistical results from PSPP match statistical results for SAS, for frequencies, means, correlation and regression.

Research with or about PSPP
One study found that students who used PSPP became more positive about learning statistics while using PSPP. Among the studies using PSPP are one about posttraumatic stress in adolescents, another about nutrition software, and another about internet addiction.

See also

Free statistical software
Comparison of statistical packages
gretl

References

External links

PSPP on Free Software Directory
Source code at Savannah

Third-party resources
Review by UK SPSS user group (as of version 0.1.22)
Using PSPP to import SPSS data into R
PSPP review in Slovene (English translation via Google)
User review from communication research info
Yet another user review

Free educational software
Free software programmed in C
Free statistical software
GNU Project software
Science software that uses GTK